The olive-headed greenbul (Arizelocichla olivaceiceps) is a species of the bulbul family of passerine birds. It is found in south-eastern Africa.

Taxonomy and systematics
The olive-headed greenbul was originally described in the genus Criniger and then classified in Andropadus. It was re-classified to the new genus Arizelocichla in 2010. Alternatively, some authorities classify the olive-headed greenbul in the genus Pycnonotus. Some authorities have considered the olive-headed greenbul to be a subspecies of the stripe-cheeked greenbul. The alternate name green-throated greenbul is also used by the yellow-throated greenbul.

Distribution and habitat
The olive-headed greenbul is found in south-western Tanzania, Malawi and north-western Mozambique.

References

olive-headed greenbul
Birds of East Africa
olive-headed greenbul